The paramo Oldfield mouse (Thomasomys paramorum) is a species of rodent in the family Cricetidae. It is found only in Ecuador.

References

Musser, G. G. and M. D. Carleton. 2005. Superfamily Muroidea. pp. 894–1531 in Mammal Species of the World a Taxonomic and Geographic Reference. D. E. Wilson and D. M. Reeder eds. Johns Hopkins University Press, Baltimore.

Thomasomys
Endemic fauna of Ecuador
Mammals of Ecuador
Rodents of South America
Páramo fauna
Mammals described in 1898
Taxa named by Oldfield Thomas
Taxonomy articles created by Polbot